The Maurie Plant Meet – Melbourne is an annual outdoor track and field meeting which takes place in February at the Lakeside Stadium in Melbourne, Australia since 2023. Last held under the old name, Melbourne Track Classic, in early March of 2016, prior to 2012 the meeting was held at the Olympic Park Stadium.

The competition was inaugurated in the late 1980s at the Olympic Stadium and gained a place on the IAAF Grand Prix circuit in its formative years. It remained on the major international outdoor track and field circuit, featuring as the opening race of the year on the IAAF World Athletics Tour from 2005 to 2009. It was the first race of the IAAF World Challenge series from 2010 through 2016. The event was also one of the foremost meets of the Australian Athletics Tour, along with the Sydney Track Classic. In 2023, the meet was upgraded and reimagined as the Maurie Plant Meet – Melbourne, held in memory of the athletics luminary as World Athletics Continental Tour Gold Level meet and part of the Chemist Warehouse Summer Series. Plant was not without controversy, however, having asked heptathlete Jane Flemming to provide a substitute urine sample for the javelin thrower Sue Howland, fearing Howland would test positive to an anabolic steroid at the Ulster Games in Belfast on 30 June 1986.

The Melbourne Track Classic featured many high level performances including continental Oceanian records by Tim Forsyth in the men's high jump, Nathan Deakes in the men's 5000 metre walk, Scott Martin in the shot put, Lisa Corrigan in the mile run and Bronwyn Thompson in the women's long jump. National records have also been set at the meeting by New Zealand and Australia's athletes.

Meeting records

Men

Women

References

Annual track and field meetings
Athletics competitions in Australia
IAAF World Challenge
IAAF Grand Prix
IAAF World Outdoor Meetings